Lake County is a county located in the north central portion of the U.S. state of California. As of the 2020 census, the population was 68,163. The county seat is Lakeport. The county takes its name from Clear Lake, the dominant geographic feature in the county and the largest non-extinct natural lake wholly within California. (Lake Tahoe is partially in Nevada; the Salton Sea was formed by flooding; Tulare Lake was drained by the agricultural industry.)

Lake County forms the Clearlake, California micropolitan statistical area. It is directly north of the San Francisco Bay Area.

Lake County is part of California's Wine Country, which also includes Napa, Sonoma, and Mendocino counties. It includes five American Viticultural Areas and over 35 wineries.

History
Lake County has been inhabited by Pomo Native Americans for over ten thousand years. Pomos had been fishermen and hunters, known especially for their intricate basketry made from lakeshore tules and other native plants and feathers. Pomo people continue to live in Lake County.

The area had European-American settlers from at least the 1840s. Lake County was created in 1861 from parts of Napa and Mendocino counties. The eastern boundary of Lake County, which was not clearly specified in the 1861 act, was clarified by legislative acts passed in 1864 and 1868. A major effect of the 1868 act was to include in Lake County the entire watershed of North Fork Cache Creek, which had previously been claimed by Colusa County.

The 1911 California Blue Book lists the major crops as Bartlett pears and beans. Other crops include grain, alfalfa, hay, prunes, peaches, apples, grapes and walnuts. Stockraising included goats, hogs, turkeys and dairying.

Some vineyards were planted in the 1870s by European Americans but the first in the state were established in the 18th century by Spanish missionaries. By the early 20th century, the area was earning a reputation for producing some of the world's greatest wines. However, in 1920, national prohibition essentially ended Lake County's wine production. With authorized cultivation limited to sacramental purposes, most of the vineyards were ripped out and replanted with walnut and pear orchards.

Wine Country 

A reemergence of Lake County's wine industry began in the 1960s when a few growers rediscovered the area's grape-growing potential and began planting vineyards. Several Lake County American Viticultural Areas, such as High Valley AVA and Red Hills Lake County AVA, have been recognized as having distinct character.

The area has increased vineyard acreage from fewer than 100 acres in 1965 to more than 9,455 acres of vineyard in 2015 (a 7.6 percent increase over 2014). Lake County's grape prices, at $1,634 per ton overall, also reached an all-time high in 2015. In 2014, Lake County surpassed Mendocino County in price paid per ton of grapes in the North Coast premium market.

The number of wineries also continues to grow, with over 35 wineries now located in Lake County.

Air quality 
Lake County has been ranked by the American Lung Association as having the cleanest air in the nation, including in 2013, 2014 and 2015. Lake County has also been ranked 24 times as having the cleanest air in California. Currently, the American Lung Association's website gives Lake County air a "C" grade for high ozone days and an "A" grade for particle pollution.

Geography
Two main watercourses drain the county: Cache Creek, which is the outlet of Clear Lake; and Putah Creek. Both of these flow to the Sacramento River. The main streams which flow into Clear Lake are Forbes Creek, Scotts Creek, Middle Creek, and Kelsey Creek. At the extreme north of the county Lake Pillsbury and the Van Arsdale Reservoir dam the Eel River, providing water and power to Ukiah in Mendocino County.

Clear Lake is believed to be the oldest warmwater lake in North America, due to a geological fluke. The lake sits on a huge block of stone which slowly tilts in the northern direction at the same rate as the lake fills in with sediment, thus keeping the water at roughly the same depth. The geology of the county is chaotic, being based on Franciscan Assemblage hills. Numerous small faults are present in the south end of the lake as well as many old volcanoes, the largest being Cobb Mountain. The geologic history of the county shows events of great violence, such as the eruption of Mount Konocti and Mount St. Helena and the collapse of Cow Mountain, which created the hills around the county seat of Lakeport. Blue Lakes, Lake Pillsbury, and Indian Valley Reservoir are the county's other major bodies of water.

Lake County has habitats for a variety of species of concern including the uncommon herb, Legenere limosa, the rare Eryngium constancei, and the tule elk. Waterfowl, bear, and other wildlife abound in the Clear Lake basin.

Due to its surrounding hilly terrain, Lake is the only one of California's 58 counties never to have been served by a railroad line.

Adjacent counties
 Glenn County - northeast
 Colusa County - east
 Yolo County - southeast
 Napa County - southeast
 Sonoma County - southwest
 Mendocino County - west

National protected areas
 Mendocino National Forest (part)
 Cow Mountain Recreation Area
 Cache Creek Wilderness and Cache Creek Wildlife Area

In 2015 President Barack Obama created the Berryessa Snow Mountain National Monument, incorporating these and other areas.

State protected areas
 Boggs Mountain Demonstration State Forest
 Anderson Marsh State Historic Park
 Loch Lomond Vernal Pool Ecological Reserve
 Boggs Lake Ecological Reserve
 Clear Lake State Park
 Rodman Slough Preserve (108 acres managed by California Department of Fish and Game)

Mineral springs
In the late 19th century, the worldwide popularity of mineral water for the relief of myriad physical ailments resulted in the development of mineral resorts around Clear Lake.
 Greene Bartlett discovered Bartlett hot springs in 1870. The springs were developed into a resort and by 1900 included a mineral water bottling plant. The resort burned down in 1934.
 Harbin Hot Springs was developed by settlers in the 1860s. Harbin burned to the ground in the Valley Fire of 2015. In January 2019 it partially reopened, including the main pools and sauna, and a limited cafetaria service.
 Highland Springs opened in 1891, and was destroyed by fire in 1945. During its time, Highland had an elegant dining room and a spacious hotel.
 Saratoga Springs Resort was opened by J. J. Liebert in 1873 with several cabins, and within two decades had room for 350 guests.
 Witter Springs Resort opened in 1873 with a hotel and guest cottages.

Climate
Lake County has a mediterranean climate with hot summer daytime temperatures in its lower elevations. Nighttime temperatures remain cool year-round, somewhat moderating average temperatures and relieving the summer heat.

Demographics

2020 census

Note: the US Census treats Hispanic/Latino as an ethnic category. This table excludes Latinos from the racial categories and assigns them to a separate category. Hispanics/Latinos can be of any race.

2011

Places by population, race, and income

2010 Census
The 2010 United States Census reported that Lake County had a population of 64,665. The racial makeup of Lake County was 52,033 (80.5%) White, 1,232 (1.9%) African American, 2,049 (3.2%) Native American, 724 (1.1%) Asian, 108 (0.2%) Pacific Islander, 5,455 (8.4%) from other races, and 3,064 (4.7%) from two or more races. Hispanic or Latino of any race were 11,088 persons (17.1%).

2005
There were a total of 34,031 homes in Lake County in 2005. This county has gone through a growth in housing units, adding a sum of 1,414 residential structures since 2001, a change of 4.3 percent. Lake County ranks 978 of 3,141, compared to change in residential structure growth in counties throughout the Unities States.

Lake County had a median home value in the year 2005 of $255,300, according to the American Community Survey. This median is less than the overall California 2005 home median value of $477,700 and greater than median home value of $167,500 for the rest of the nation in that year. In 2005, the American Community Survey reported that 14.4% of Lake County's owner-occupied dwellings are valued over a half a million dollars.

In the county, the population was spread out, with 24.1% under the age of 18, 6.0% from 18 to 24, 23.6% from 25 to 44, 26.8% from 45 to 64, and 19.5% who were 65 years of age or older. The median age was 43 years. For every 100 females there were 97.6 males. For every 100 females age 18 and over, there were 94.7 males.

The median income for a household in the county was $49,627, and the median income for a family was $55,818. Males had a median income of $45,771 versus $44,026 for females. The per capita income for the county was $43,825. About 6.9% of families and 4.6% of the population were below the poverty line, including 22.8% of those under age 18 and 7.3% of those age 65 or over. (Source: U.S. Census Bureau)

Within Lake County are two incorporated cities, the county seat of Lakeport and Clearlake, the largest city, and the communities of Kelseyville, Blue Lakes, Clearlake Oaks, Clearlake Park, Cobb, Finley, Glenhaven, Hidden Valley Lake, Clearlake Riviera, Loch Lomond, Lower Lake, Lucerne, Middletown, Nice, Spring Valley, Upper Lake, Whispering Pines, and Witter Springs.

The income of residents of the county varies widely. The county is the largest employer thus far, followed by large retailers such as Wal-Mart, Safeway, and Kmart. Lake County is mostly agricultural, with tourist facilities and some light industry. Major crops include pears, walnuts and, increasingly, wine grapes.

2000
According to official estimates based on the 2000 Census, 30% of housing units in Lake County were manufactured housing units. This was the highest percentage of any California county.

Politics

Voter registration

Cities by population and voter registration

Overview 
In its early history, Lake County leaned Democratic in Presidential and congressional elections. It supported every Democratic presidential candidate between 1864 and 1916 except Alton B. Parker in his 1904 landslide defeat. Nonetheless, between 1920 and 1984 Lake County tended towards being Republican and was won by just four Democratic nominees – Franklin D. Roosevelt in 1932 and 1936, Lyndon B. Johnson in 1964 and Jimmy Carter in 1976. Ronald Reagan in 1984 remains the last Republican to win a majority in the county, which has reverted to leaning Democratic.

In the state legislature, Lake is part of the 4th Assembly district and the 2nd Senate district.

On November 4, 2008, Lake County voted 52.6% for Proposition 8, which amended the California Constitution to ban same-sex marriages.

Crime 

The following table includes the number of incidents reported and the rate per 1,000 persons for each type of offense.

Cities by population and crime rates

Economy
The main crops in 2011, 2014 and 2015 (in thousands of dollars) are:

Transportation

Major highways
 State Route 20
 State Route 29
 State Route 53
 State Route 175
 State Route 281

There are also several numbered county routes in Lake County.

Public transportation
Lake Transit serves all areas around Clear Lake. Local routes serve Lakeport, Clearlake and Lower Lake. Connections are also provided to St. Helena (in Napa County) and Ukiah (in Mendocino County). Some routes operate on weekdays only; no service is provided on Sundays and observed public holidays.

Airports
Lampson Field is the county's public airport. There are also several private airstrips located throughout the county.

Historical railroads
In 1888 the Vaca Valley and Clear Lake Railroad reached Rumsey, but the planned line to Clear Lake was never built. The Clear Lake Railroad started work on a line from Hopland to Lakeport: "In November 1911 first ground was broken for the Hopland-Clear Lake railroad to Hopland. Mrs Harriet Lee Hammond, wife of the president of the road started construction. ... There were six miles of track out of Hopland ...", but this was also abandoned.

Communities

Cities
 Clearlake
 Lakeport (county seat)

Census-designated places

 Clearlake Oaks
 Clearlake Riviera
 Cobb
 Hidden Valley Lake
 Kelseyville
 Lower Lake
 Lucerne
 Middletown
 Nice
 North Lakeport
 Soda Bay
 Spring Valley
 Upper Lake

Unincorporated communities
 Finley
 Glenhaven
 Loch Lomond
 Parramore Springs
 Whispering Pines

Population ranking

The population ranking of the following table is based on the 2010 census of Lake County.

† county seat

Notable people
 Benjamin Dewell, former Bear Flagger
 Ellis O. Knox, first African American to be awarded a Ph.D. on the West Coast of the United States.
 Lillie Langtry, British actress and royal mistress
 Michael Berryman, American actor

See also 
 Rivers of Lake County, California
 California wine
 Lampson Field Airport
 List of lakes in Lake County, California
 National Register of Historic Places listings in Lake County, California

Notes

References

External links
 
 Lake County visitor website
 Lake County News
 Lake County Record Bee Newspaper
 Wine country moves north (San Francisco Chronicle)
 The Ample Charms of a Well-Fed Lake, by Richerson & Richerson
 Lake County, California: History of the County
 Lake County Ca. Weather and Road Conditions

 
California counties
1861 establishments in California
Populated places established in 1861